The Glafkos is a small river in the city of Patras, Greece. It flows into the Gulf of Patras (Ionian Sea) in Patras south of the city centre.

A hydroelectric power plant was built on this river in 1927. Currently, it is open to the public as a museum. 

Its source is in the southern part of the mountain Panachaiko, near the village Vetaiika. It flows along the villages Moira and Neo Souli, and through the southern part of the city of Patras.

References

External links

Rivers of Greece
Geography of Patras
Landforms of Achaea
Rivers of Western Greece
Drainage basins of the Ionian Sea